Dimethyl pimelimidate (DMP) is an organic chemical compound with two functional imidate groups.  It is usually available as the more stable dihydrochloride salt.  It binds free amino groups at pH range 7.0-10.0 to form amidine bonds.

Uses
DMP is used mainly as bifunctional coupling reagent to link proteins. It is often used to prepare antibody affinity columns. The appropriate antibody is first incubated with Protein A or Protein G-agarose and allowed to bind. DMP is then added to couple the molecules together.

Health effects
DMP is irritating to the eyes, skin, mucous membranes and upper respiratory tract. It can exert harmful effects by inhalation, ingestion, or skin absorption.

References 
 MSDS safety data, also available in other languages
 Sigma-Aldrich product detail
 MSDS datasheet

Carboximidates